The Evergreen Premier League (EPLWA) is an amateur men's soccer league in the U.S. state of Washington affiliated with the United States Adult Soccer Association. The league was established in 2013 and is contested by ten teams— eight from Western Washington and two from Eastern Washington. The current champions are Bellingham United. The league is headquartered in Bellingham.

History

EPLWA was founded in 2013 and began accepting clubs in August of that year, beginning with Bellingham United transferring from the Pacific Coast Soccer League as the league's founding member. The league adopted its current logo, a silhouetted soccer player over a map of Washington, in September 2013. On May 16, 2014, three weeks into the league's inaugural season, EPLWA was recognized as an "Elite Amateur League" affiliated with the United States Adult Soccer Association.

The inaugural season was won by the Spokane Shadow. The Shadow went on to win the second season with only a single defeat in their 13 matches, finishing with 32 points.

Everett Jets FC was announced as the league's 12th team in 2020.

Teams

Former teams

Hiatus

Seasons
.

Notes

References

External links

EPLWA at GoalWA
USASA Profile

 
Sports leagues established in 2013
2013 establishments in Washington (state)
Regional Soccer leagues in the United States